The Sword of Hope II, known in Japan as , is a 1992 role-playing video game developed and published by Kemco for the Game Boy.

It is the sequel to the 1989 The Sword of Hope. In 1998, these two games were rereleased in Japan as a single Game Boy cartridge, Selection I & II. The Sword of Hope II was released for the 3DS Virtual Console in 2012.

A "dungeon crawler"-type game, the player must retrieve the Sword of Hope, which has been stolen, and find the evil Zakdos who has been set free after being imprisoned.

Reception
The four reviewers of Electronic Gaming Monthly were mostly dissatisfied by the game, with their main complaint being that the battles are much too slow and time-consuming, making combat and travel a chore rather than a pleasure. Crispin Boyer and Sushi-X, however, found that it was still a decent enough game for those who liked the first game in the series or simply wanted a portable RPG. They scored it a 5.25 out of 10. GamePro gave it a negative review, citing the generic, slow, overly frequent, and repetitive battles.

Notes

External links
JPgbx
The Sword of Hope II at GameFAQs
Selection II: Ankoku no Fuuin at Nintendo.co.jp 

1992 video games
Game Boy games
Kemco games
Role-playing video games
Video game sequels
Video games developed in Japan
Virtual Console games
Virtual Console games for Nintendo 3DS

ja:セレクション 選ばれし者